Damian Bradfield (born  29 March 1977) is a British businessman. He is the Chief Creative Officer and a founding shareholder of the file-transfer service WeTransfer.

Bradfield was born in Canterbury, Kent in England. He attended Kent College and then the London School of Economics.

After graduating from LSE, Bradfield worked for Gucci Group and Stella McCartney before moving onto a career in advertising in London. In 2005, he began working for the agency J. Walter Thompson (JWT). He relocated to Amsterdam to work in the JWT office there, but spent much of his time in Moscow working for one of the agency's largest clients. In 2010, Bradfield left JWT and established his own design studio, Present Plus, with Dutch entrepreneur Nalden. There they created the wallpaper app Kuvva.

In 2016, Bradfield relocated from Amsterdam to California to set up WeTransfer's U.S. headquarters in Venice, Los Angeles, closer to the company's core client base. He has been instrumental in shaping the company's policy in support of the creative and arts community. In July 2017, Bradfield, in his capacity as WeTransfer president, offered a $10,000 "gift" "to start something" to any of the 173 employees laid off at SoundCloud.

Bradfield is chairman of the University of the Underground and The Supporting Act, and a trustee of the Sarabande Foundation. He is a member of the Champions of Change Global Tech group and a director of Tour De Moon Ltd., a free touring public festival happening in the UK in 2022. He is the host of the podcast Influence. He is the author of the 2019 Penguin book, The Trust Manifesto: What You Need to Do to Create a Better Internet, and the co-author of the 2021 book Los años de internet (The Internet Years).

Bradfield is married with two children and currently resides in Santa Monica, California.

References

External links
 

1977 births
Living people
21st-century English businesspeople
British advertising executives
Alumni of the London School of Economics
People from Canterbury
Technology business executives